Dorothy Baker (April 21, 1907 – June 17, 1968) was an American novelist from Missoula, Montana and raised in California. Baker wrote the notable lesbian pulp title Trio (1943), along with widely-successful romance novels. She married poet Howard Baker and together they composed fiction and plays.

Early life and education
She was born Dorothy Alice Dodds on April 21, 1907 in Missoula, Montana to Raymond Branson Dodds and Alice Sowers Grady. Dorothy was raised in California, where her father worked in the oil business. As a child, she played the violin, but became crippled with polio and resigned to write about music instead of playing it.

She studied at Occidental College and Whittier College, then transferred to the University of California, Los Angeles, from where she graduated in 1929 with a B.A. in French.  She was a member of the sorority Gamma Phi Beta. Upon graduation, she traveled to France where she met her future husband, the poet Howard Baker. The two married on August 22, 1930. The couple moved back to California where Dorothy wrote her first novel while completing her M.A. in French from UCLA, which she received in 1934. 

After finishing her Master's, Baker taught at a small preparatory school until the mid-30s when she left to pursue a writing career.

Career
Baker began her writing career by publishing a few short stories about one of her her favorite topics, jazz. She once said, "Jazz music was one of the very few things I knew much about, and the only thing, except writing, that I had a consistent, long-term interest in". Baker incorporated her love for music into her novels.

Her love for jazz resulted in Baker's first novel, Young Man with a Horn (1938), based on the life of cornet player Bix Beiderbecke. The novel was a success and she won a Houghton Mifflin Literary Fellowship. The novel's character Amy was Baker's first character who was written with an ambiguous interest in women. It is unclear what Baker's opinions on lesbianism were, towards others and herself. It seems Baker felt akin to her character Amy; in a 1962 interview she said that she would have been "happier as a boy", the same as Amy. In real life and in her fiction, Baker had a blurred and confused relationship with her own sexuality. Around the time that Baker published Young Man with a Horn, she revealed her lesbian inclinations to a group of her close friends, but Baker remained married to her husband, and it seems these inclinations were mostly set aside, except for in her fiction. Each romantic relationship in Baker's novels are doomed to be impossible. Three of her novels include lesbian-leaning characters, although in each case their sexuality is slightly warped: "too insistently smart, too anxiously empty, a little malicious."  In 1950, Young Man with a Horn was made into a movie of the same name with Kirk Douglas, Lauren Bacall, and Doris Day. Baker received a Guggenheim Fellowship for her next book in 1942. 

Her next book Trio was published in 1943. The story was a big departure from her previous work: "[Trio] deals with the rivalry between a sophisticated female French professor and an unsuspecting young man for the attention of a female graduate student." With its themes of lesbianism, the subject of the novel drew critical response. In interviews, Baker would deny the references to lesbianism. The book was not considered immoral by the Commonwealth Club of California, and the club also gave Trio the General Literature Gold Medal in 1943. Baker and her husband made the novel into a play, but it was quickly taken off Broadway on grounds of obscenity, because of its lesbian themes.

After the failure of her play, she went back to writing novels. Cassandra at the Wedding was published in 1962 and it did much better than Trio. While Cassandra at the Wedding also contained lesbian overtones, the subject was handled in a less judgemental way: "Where Trio presents lesbianism as overtly destructive—the lesbian “villain” is disgraced and then commits suicide—in the later novel same-sex relations are simply part of the psychological puzzle from which the protagonist emerges as a stronger, more independent woman. In a redemptive image at the end of the novel, Cassandra walks across the Golden Gate Bridge with thoughts, not of suicide, but of life and art." Howard Baker asserted that the characters in Cassandra at the Wedding were based on Dorothy herself and the couple's own two daughters. This novel won the admiration of Alfred Kazin and Carson McCullers.

Personal life and death
After the failure of Baker's Trio, the family moved from Cambridge, Massachusetts to a ranch in Terra Bella, California. At the time, Dorothy and Howard had one child and another on the way. In between writing novels, she wrote plays, raised her children, and ran a theater and a citrus farm. Dorothy and Howard Baker had two daughters, Ellen and Joan.

Baker named Ernest Hemingway as her role model.

On June 17, 1968, Baker died of cancer at the age of 61 in Terra Bella, California.

Bibliography 

 Young Man with a Horn (1938)
 Trio (1943)
 Coast Town Tapestry (1946)
 Our Gifted Son (1948)
 Cassandra at the Wedding (1962)
 The Ninth Day (1967)

References

Further reading 
 The papers of Dorothy and Howard Baker, 1926-1990 (33 linear ft.) are housed in the Department of Special Collections and University Archives at Stanford University Libraries
The Dorothy and Howard Baker papers, circa 1937-1967 are housed in The Bancroft Library at the University of California, Berkeley.
Worldcat Identity for Baker, Dorothy 1907-1968

1907 births
1968 deaths
Writers from Missoula, Montana
American women novelists
Whittier College alumni
University of California, Los Angeles alumni
20th-century American novelists
American women dramatists and playwrights
20th-century American women writers
20th-century American dramatists and playwrights
Pulp fiction writers